Bonesgate Stream is a brook in Chessington in Kingston upon Thames in London and Epsom and Ewell in Surrey. It is a tributary of the Hogsmill River, which, in turn, is a tributary of the River Thames.

Course
The brook then flows north-east through Castle Hill and Bonesgate Open Space Local Nature Reserves via Filby Road to Chessington Road. The stream continues north-east into the Hogmsill Open space, where it serves as the Greater London/Surrey boundary. It skirts the northern edge of West Ewell, passing between the Wateredge Estate on one side, and Tolworth Court Fields on the other. It joins the Hogsmill near Tolworth Court Bridge, at the junction of Kingston Road and Worcester Park Road.

References

Rivers of London
2Bonesgate